Orshawante Bryant (born November 16, 1978) is a former American football wide receiver who played six seasons in the Arena Football League with the Arizona Rattlers and Utah Blaze. He played college football at Portland State University and attended Rubidoux High School in Riverside, California. Bryant is Portland State's all-time leader in receptions and receiving yards.

References

External links
Just Sports Stats

Living people
1978 births
Players of American football from Riverside, California
American football wide receivers
American football defensive backs
African-American players of American football
Portland State Vikings football players
Arizona Rattlers players
Utah Blaze players
21st-century African-American sportspeople
20th-century African-American sportspeople